Allegiant Athletic Agency (a3) is an athletic agency that represents professional football (NFL) and Basketball (NBA, International) players, as well as coaches. a3 is located in downtown Knoxville, Tennessee near the University of Tennessee.
Most recently a3 has been in the news for representing Defensive Tackle Albert Haynesworth of the Washington Redskins. Haynesworth was represented by [Chad Speck] as he signed his contract in the free agency market that included the largest guaranteed package in NFL history.

a3 currently represents the following NFL players: Safety and 2011 NFL Pro Bowl Selection Eric Berry of the Kansas City Chiefs, Defensive Tackle Albert Haynesworth of the Washington Redskins, Offensive Guard Chris Scott of the Pittsburgh Steelers, Outside Linebacker Paris Lenon of the St. Louis Rams, Defensive End Leonard Little of the St. Louis Rams, Outside Linebacker Stephen Nicholas of the Atlanta Falcons, free agent Tight End Cooper Wallace, Wide Receiver Kelley Washington of the Baltimore Ravens, Wide Receiver Chad Hall of the Philadelphia Eagles, Wide Receiver Manuel Johnson of the Dallas Cowboys, Wide Receiver Juaquin Iglesias of the Chicago Bears, Offensive Guard Anthony Herrera of the Minnesota Vikings, Wide Receiver Malcolm Kelly of the Washington Redskins, Offensive Lineman and 2011 NFL Pro Bowl Selection Tyson Clabo of the Atlanta Falcons, Wide Receiver Dwayne Harris of the Dallas Cowboys, Offensive Tackle Joseph Barksdale of the Oakland Raiders, Wide Receiver Denarius Moore of the Oakland Raiders, Cornerback Curtis Brown of the Pittsburgh Steelers, Offensive Tackle Demarcus Love of the Minnesota Vikings and free agent Wide Receiver Jemalle Cornelius.

a3 currently represents the following basketball players: Point Guard CJ Watson of the Indiana Pacers, Shooting Guard Chris Lofton (International & NBDL), Power Forward Wayne Chism (NBDL), Guard Barry Stewart (International), Forward Tyler Smith (International), Forward James “Boo” Jackson (International), Point Guard Tony White Jr. (International), Forward Desmond Yates (International), Center John Fields of the University of Tennessee and Guard Kashif Watson of the University of Idaho.  

a3's current staff includes individuals with backgrounds in business, law, and athletics. The agents are former Clemson safety Chad Speck , former University of Tennessee Chattanooga basketball player Isaac Conner , former Belmont University basketball player Jared Karnes , and former University of Tennessee defensive back Tommy Sims. Other staffers include Director of Client Development Judy Jackson , Director of Business Administration James Clawson , Marketing Director Ashley Kerns , Events Coordinator Amber Park and in charge of a3 Events Development and Player Marketing is Hunter Baddour. a3 also has a host of interns from undergraduate and graduate school.

a3 trains its athletes at a number of different complexes, but the main training ground is Competitive Edge Sports (CES) . More professional athletes and NFL talents have trained at CES than anyone else in the world. CES has trained notable NFL figures like Albert Haynesworth, Brian Urlacher, and Champ Bailey. CES was founded by Chip Smith .

References

 https://web.archive.org/web/20090921173221/http://www.a3athletics.com/index.php

Talent agencies
Sports management companies